StretchText is a hypertext feature that has not gained mass adoption in systems like the World Wide Web, but gives more control to the reader in determining what level of detail to read at. Authors write content to several levels of detail in a work.

StretchText is similar to outlining, however instead of drilling down lists to greater detail, the current node is replaced with a newer node. This ‘stretching’ to increase the amount of writing, or contracting to decrease it gives the feature its name. This is analogous to zooming in to get more detail.

Ted Nelson coined the term .

Conceptually, StretchText is similar to existing hypertexts system where a link provides a more descriptive or exhaustive explanation of something, but there is a key difference between a link and a piece of StretchText. A link completely replaces the current piece of hypertext with the destination, whereas StretchText expands or contracts the content in place. Thus, the existing hypertext serves as context.

References

 “Stretchtext – hypertext note #8” by Ted Nelson (April 29, 1967). Part of Nelson’s Project Xanadu. (TIFF)

Hypertext
1960s neologisms